Sniazhana Ulazimirauna Yurchanka (born 1 August 1984) is a female Belarusian race walker. Yurchanka represented Belarus at the 2008 Summer Olympics in Beijing, where she competed for the women's 20 km race walk, along with her compatriots Elena Ginko and Ryta Turava. Despite of the tumultuous weather, Yurchanka finished the race in thirty-third place, with a time of 1:35:33.

References

External links

NBC 2008 Olympics profile

1984 births
Living people
Belarusian female racewalkers
Olympic athletes of Belarus
Athletes (track and field) at the 2008 Summer Olympics
Universiade medalists in athletics (track and field)
Sportspeople from Gomel
Universiade bronze medalists for Russia
Medalists at the 2007 Summer Universiade